PRCA may refer to:
Professional Rodeo Cowboys Association
Protestant Reformed Churches in America
Public Relations and Communications Association
Pure red cell aplasia
Pusch Ridge Christian Academy, a school in Oro Valley, Arizona